Sir Robert Laurie Morant,  (7 April 1863 – 13 March 1920) was an English administrator and educationalist.

Career overview
Born in Hampstead, Morant was the older brother of Amy Morant. He was educated at Winchester College and New College, Oxford where he took a First in Theology.

After a year teaching at a Preparatory School he was appointed as tutor to the crown prince of Siam. On his return he worked at the Toynbee Hall settlement in the East End of London.

He then joined a research unit reporting to the Privy Council on Education and thence to the Board of Education, where he rose rapidly and served as private secretary to Sir John Gorst, Vice-President of the Committee on Education until 1902. He was responsible for some of the new ideas in the Education Act 1902, and was appointed Permanent Secretary to the Education Board in April 1903, being thus placed in a position to ensure the Board effectively implemented the act. He was appointed a Companion of the Order of the Bath (CB) in the 1902 Coronation Honours, and promoted to Knight Commander (KCB) of the order in the 1907 Birthday Honours.

In 1905 he was involved in a dispute concerning a school inspection report by Katherine Bathurst and her outspoken views on elementary education for under fives. This resulted in Bathurst having to resign and for the ministry publishing her report but with Morant's apologies and annotations.

In 1911 he was forced to resign as Permanent Secretary of the Board of Education after the leaking of a confidential report critical of school inspectors. Written by the chief inspector, it disparaged inspectors who had no more than an elementary education and recommended that inspectors should in future been drawn from Oxbridge graduates. Under pressure of work, Morant approved the report without reading it and, as a civil servant, was unable to reply to public criticism, including questions in the House of Commons, and from Edmond Holmes. He then accepted a post chairing the commission to implement the National Insurance Act 1911. This included a huge and wide-ranging task of administration and even included the foundation of the precursor of the Medical Research Council. Morant promoted and largely drafted the National Insurance Act 1913, correcting problems in the previous Act.

He served on the Haldane committee on the machinery of government, 1917–18.

When the Ministry of Health was created in 1919 he became its Permanent Secretary.

He died of influenza on 13 March 1920 aged 56.

In 1917 Beatrice Webb called him "the one man of genius in the Civil Service", and A. L. Rowse, writing in 1942, said he was "by universal acclaim the greatest civil servant of his time".

Family
In 1896 he married Helen Mary Cracknell.

References

External links 
 Photograph of Sir Robert in the National Portrait Gallery's collection

1863 births
1920 deaths
People educated at Winchester College
Permanent Secretaries of the Board of Education
Permanent Secretaries of the Ministry of Health
Alumni of New College, Oxford
Knights Commander of the Order of the Bath